SML, Sistema de Pagamentos em Moeda Local (en: Local Currency Payment System)

The SML was established on October 3, 2008. It allows that payment orders are paid and received in local currency. Initially, the SML was used only in transactions between Brazil and Argentina, but recently Brazilian Central Bank is studying the expansion of the system to other countries like Uruguay and Paraguay. More countries, like Russia, India and China have shown interest in adopting the system in bilateral trade with Brazil.

Senders and recipients have the option of paying or receiving payment in their own local currency. This supposedly makes life easier for small producers, which until then were used to sell and buy goods only in their own currencies. They don’t have to fix their prices in US-Dollars or calculate exchange-rates their own currency and the currency of the other country, intermediating with the US-dollar.

The system includes by the central banks authorized financial institutions. Transactions are made between the financial institutions and the Central Banks. The importers and exporters fix their prices using the SML-rate published by the Central Banks.
 
In the first year Brazilians and Argentines only used the SML in transactions involving goods, but central banks are considering enable operations of trade in services and payments of social benefits.

References

External links
Brazilian Central Bank
Argentinean Central Bank

Payment systems
2008 introductions